The Teufelsmauer is a rock massif in the valley of the Black Pockau between Pobershau and Germany's state border with the Czech Republic. It is made of red and gray gneiss. The valley is also known as the Schwarzwasser ("Black Water"). The countryside is very attractive. A channel called the Grüne Graben ("Green Ditch") runs down the western slopes of the valley that used to provide the necessary water for the mines near Pobershau.

The Teufelsmauer is known today for its rock climbing.

Geography of the Ore Mountains